Sergei Nikolayevich Miroshnichenko (born 18 July 1982) is a Russian professional football coach and a former player. He is an assistant coach with FC Krasnodar-2.

Career
He made his Russian Football National League debut for FC Ural Yekaterinburg on 31 March 2007 in a game against FC KAMAZ Naberezhnye Chelny.

On 27 January 2015, Miroshnichenko signed for FC Anzhi Makhachkala.

References

External links
 

1982 births
Living people
People from Maykop
Russian footballers
Association football defenders
FC Energiya Volzhsky players
FC Ural Yekaterinburg players
FC Krasnodar players
FC Khimki players
FC Chernomorets Novorossiysk players
FC Salyut Belgorod players
FC Dynamo Saint Petersburg players
FC Luch Vladivostok players
FC Anzhi Makhachkala players
FC Armavir players
FC Orenburg players
FC Spartak-UGP Anapa players
Sportspeople from Adygea